Renovabis is a charitable organization of the Roman Catholic Church in Germany, established in 1993 to help people in Eastern and Central Europe.  Its main office is located in Freising, Germany.

By its own account, Renovabis has spent about US$400,000,000 in private donations on 14,000 assistance projects in 28 countries.

References

Christian organizations established in 1993
Catholic charities

Development charities
Eastern Europe
Development charities based in Germany